This is a list of endorsements made by Donald Trump.

Domestic

Before Presidency

2008

2012

As President

2017 Senate special election

2018 gubernatorial elections

2018 Senate elections

2019 gubernatorial elections

2020 Senate elections

2020 Senate runoff elections

Post-Presidency

2021 gubernatorial elections

2022 gubernatorial elections

2022 Senate elections 
All of Trump's endorsements in the 2022 Senate elections have won their primaries so far, though he did change his endorsements in Alabama and Pennsylvania after Sean Parnell withdrew from the race and when he revoked his endorsement of Mo Brooks.

2022 House elections

2022 State executive elections

Other elections 
 2022 Alaska's at-large congressional district special election: endorsed Sarah Palin (advanced to general election from nonpartisan blanket primary but lost general election).
 2022 election to Arizona's 7th legislative district: endorsed Wendy Rogers (won primary).

International

Brazil
In 2021, Trump gave his endorsement to Brazilian President Jair Bolsonaro for the 2022 Brazilian general election. (Bolsonaro Lost)

Hungary
In January 2022, Trump gave his endorsement to Hungarian Prime Minister Viktor Orbán for the 2022 Hungarian parliamentary election. (Orbán Won)

Israel
In 2013, Trump gave his endorsement to Israeli Prime Minister Benjamin Netanyahu for the 2013 Israeli legislative election who would go on to win the election.

In 2019, Trump gave his endorsement to Israeli Prime Minister Benjamin Netanyahu for the April 2019 Israeli legislative election which resulted in a hung parliament.

UK
In 2016, Trump  gave his endorsement to the UK to Leave the EU for the 2016 United Kingdom European Union membership referendum. (UK voted Leave)

References

External links 
 
News section of DonaldJTrump.com

Political career of Donald Trump
Trump, Donald
Trump, Donald
Trumpism